This is a list of transactions that took place during the 2021 NBA off-season and the 2021–22 NBA season. The season set a new record for the highest number of different players to appear in at least one game in a single season.

Retirement

Front office movements

Head coaching changes
Off-season

In-Season

General manager changes
Off-season

Player movements

Trades

{| class="wikitable" style="text-align:center"
|+
! colspan="4" |June
|-
| June 18
|align="left" valign="top" |To Boston Celtics
Moses Brown
Al Horford
2023 second-round pick
|align="left" valign="top" |To Oklahoma City Thunder
Kemba Walker
2021 BOS first-round pick
2025 second-round pick
|align="center"| 
|-
! colspan="4" |July
|-
| rowspan="2" |July 29(Draft-day trades)
| align="left" valign="top" |To Los Angeles Clippers
Draft rights to Jason Preston (No. 33)
| align="left" valign="top" |To Orlando Magic
2026 DET second-round pick
Cash considerations
| 
|-
|align="left" valign="top" |To New Orleans Pelicans
Cash considerations
|align="left" valign="top" |To Philadelphia 76ers
2021 No. 53 pick
|align="center"| 
|-
| rowspan="7" | July 30
| align="left" valign="top" |To New Orleans Pelicans
2026 POR second-round pick
Cash considerations
| align="left" valign="top" |To Portland Trail Blazers
Draft rights to Greg Brown (No. 43)
| 
|-
| align="left" valign="top" |To Houston Rockets
Draft rights to Alperen Şengün (No. 16)
| align="left" valign="top" |To Oklahoma City Thunder
2022 DET protected first-round pick
2023 WAS protected first-round pick
| 
|-
| align="left" valign="top" |To Los Angeles Clippers
Draft rights to Keon Johnson (No. 21)
| align="left" valign="top" |To New York Knicks
Draft rights to Quentin Grimes (No. 25)
2024 DET second-round pick
| 
|-
| align="left" valign="top" |To Charlotte Hornets
Draft rights to Kai Jones (No. 19)
| align="left" valign="top" |To New York Knicks
2022 CHA protected first-round pick
| 
|-
| align="left" valign="top" |To Indiana Pacers
Draft rights to Isaiah Todd (No. 31)
| align="left" valign="top" |To Milwaukee Bucks
Draft rights to Sandro Mamukelashvili (No. 54)
Draft rights to Georgios Kalaitzakis (No. 60)
2024 second-round pick
2026 second-round pick
| 
|-
| align="left" valign="top" |To New York Knicks
Draft rights to Rokas Jokubaitis (No. 34)
Draft rights to Miles McBride (No. 36)
| align="left" valign="top" |To Oklahoma City Thunder
Draft rights to Jeremiah Robinson-Earl (No. 32)
| 
|-
| align="left" valign="top" |To Oklahoma City Thunder
Derrick Favors
2024 protected first-round pick
| align="left" valign="top" |To Utah Jazz
2027 second-round pick
Cash considerations
| 
|-
| July 31
| align="left" valign="top" |To Boston Celtics
Josh Richardson
| align="left" valign="top" |To Dallas Mavericks
Moses Brown
| 
|-
! colspan="4" |August
|-
| August 2
|align="left" valign="top" |To Cleveland Cavaliers
Ricky Rubio
|align="left" valign="top" |To Minnesota Timberwolves
Taurean Prince
2022 WAS second−round pick
Cash considerations
|align="center"| 
|-
| rowspan="7" |August 6
|align="left" valign="top" |To Charlotte Hornets
Mason Plumlee
Draft rights to JT Thor (No. 37)
|align="left" valign="top" |To Detroit Pistons
Draft rights to Balša Koprivica (No. 57)
| 
|-
|align="left" valign="top" |To Miami Heat
Kyle Lowry (sign-and-trade)
|align="left" valign="top" |To Toronto Raptors
Precious Achiuwa
Goran Dragić
| 
|-
|align="left" valign="top" |To Brooklyn Nets
Jevon Carter
Draft rights to Day'Ron Sharpe (No. 29)
|align="left" valign="top" |To Phoenix Suns
Landry Shamet
|align="center"| 
|-
|colspan=2|Five-team trade
|rowspan=4| 
|-
|align="left" valign="top" |To Brooklyn Nets
2024 second-round pick (from Washington)
2025 second-round pick swap right (from Washington)
Draft rights to Nikola Milutinov (2015 No. 26) (from San Antonio)
|align="left" valign="top" |To Indiana Pacers
Draft rights to Isaiah Jackson (No. 22) (from LA Lakers)
|-
|align="left" valign="top" |To Los Angeles Lakers
Russell Westbrook (from Washington)
2023 CHI second-round pick (from Washington)
2024 second-round pick (from Washington)
2028 WAS second-round pick (from Washington)
|align="left" valign="top" |To San Antonio Spurs
Chandler Hutchison (from Washington)
2022 second-round pick (from Washington)
|-
|colspan=2 align="left" valign="top" |To Washington Wizards
Kentavious Caldwell-Pope (from LA Lakers)
Spencer Dinwiddie (sign-and-trade) (from Brooklyn)
Montrezl Harrell (from LA Lakers)
Aaron Holiday (from Indiana)
Kyle Kuzma (from LA Lakers)
Draft rights to Isaiah Todd (No. 31) (from Indiana)
Cash considerations (from Indiana)
|-
| rowspan="12" |August 7
|colspan=2|Three-team trade
|rowspan=3| 
|-
|align="left" valign="top" |To Charlotte Hornets
Wes Iwundu (from New Orleans)
Draft rights to Tyler Harvey (2015 No. 51) (from Memphis)
2022 NOP protected first-round pick (from New Orleans)
Cash considerations (from New Orleans)
|align="left" valign="top" |To Memphis Grizzlies
Steven Adams (from New Orleans)
Eric Bledsoe (from New Orleans)
Draft rights to Ziaire Williams (No. 10) (from New Orleans)
Draft rights to Jared Butler (No. 40) (from New Orleans)
2022 LAL protected first-round pick (from New Orleans)
|-
|colspan=2 align="left" valign="top" |To New Orleans Pelicans
Devonte' Graham (sign-and-trade) (from Charlotte) 
Jonas Valančiūnas (from Memphis)
Draft rights to Trey Murphy III (No. 17) (from Memphis)
Draft rights to Brandon Boston Jr. (No. 51) (from Memphis)
|-
|align="left" valign="top" |To Memphis Grizzlies
Draft rights to Santi Aldama (No. 30)
|align="left" valign="top" |To Utah Jazz
Draft rights to Jared Butler (No. 40)
2022 MEM second-round pick
2026 MEM second-round pick
|align="center"| 
|-
|align="left" valign="top" |To Los Angeles Clippers
Draft rights to Brandon Boston Jr. (No. 51)
|align="left" valign="top" |To New Orleans Pelicans
2022 SAC protected second-round pick
Cash considerations
|align="center"| 
|-
|align="left" valign="top" |To Chicago Bulls
Cash considerations
|align="left" valign="top" |To Houston Rockets
Daniel Theis (sign-and-trade)
|align="center"| 
|-
|align="left" valign="top" |To Golden State Warriors
2026 MEM protected second-round pick
|align="left" valign="top" |To Utah Jazz
Eric Paschall
|align="center"| 
|-
|align="left" valign="top" |To Indiana Pacers
2023 SAS protected second-round pick
|align="left" valign="top" |To San Antonio Spurs
Doug McDermott (sign-and-trade)
2023 IND protected second-round pick
2026 second-round pick swap right
|align="center"| 
|-
|colspan=2|Three-team trade
|rowspan=3| 
|-
|align="left" valign="top" |To Atlanta Hawks
Delon Wright (from Sacramento)
|align="left" valign="top" |To Boston Celtics
Kris Dunn (from Atlanta)
Bruno Fernando (from Atlanta)
2023 POR second-round pick (from Atlanta)
|-
|colspan=2 align="left" valign="top" |To Sacramento Kings
Tristan Thompson (from Boston)
|-
|align="left" valign="top" |To Memphis Grizzlies
Sam Merrill
2024 second-round pick
2026 second-round pick
|align="left" valign="top" |To Milwaukee Bucks
Grayson Allen
|align="center"| 
|-
| August 8
|align="left" valign="top" |To Chicago Bulls
Lonzo Ball (sign-and-trade)
|align="left" valign="top" |To New Orleans Pelicans
Tomáš Satoranský
Garrett Temple (sign-and-trade)
2024 CHI second-round pick
Cash considerations
|align="center"| 
|-
| August 11
|align="left" valign="top" |To Chicago Bulls
DeMar DeRozan (sign-and-trade)
|align="left" valign="top" |To San Antonio Spurs
Al-Farouq Aminu
Thaddeus Young
2022 second-round pick
2025 CHI protected first-round pick
2025 CHI second-round pick
|align="center"| 
|-
| August 16
|align="left" valign="top" |To Los Angeles Clippers
Eric Bledsoe
|align="left" valign="top" |To Memphis Grizzlies
Patrick Beverley
Daniel Oturu
Rajon Rondo
|align="center"| 
|-
| August 17
|align="left" valign="top" |To Boston Celtics
Cash considerations
|align="left" valign="top" |To New York Knicks
Evan Fournier (sign-and-trade)
2022 CHA protected second-round pick
2023 second-round pick
|align="center"| 
|-
| August 25
|align="left" valign="top" |To Memphis Grizzlies
Jarrett Culver
Juancho Hernangómez
|align="left" valign="top" |To Minnesota Timberwolves
Patrick Beverley
|align="center"| 
|-
|rowspan=3| August 28
|colspan=2|Three-team trade
|rowspan=3| 
|-
|align="left" valign="top" |To Chicago Bulls
Derrick Jones Jr. (from Portland)
2022 POR protected first-round pick (from Portland){{refn|group="lower-alpha"|Chicago will receive the pick if it's No. 15–30, rolling over with the same condition through 2028; if the pick is not conveyed by 2028, Chicago will receive Portland's 2028 second-round pick. It's possible the 2028 pick would be Chicago's, in which case it will be forfeited for tampering in the DeMar Derozan trade. }}
2023 DEN protected second-round pick (from Cleveland)
|align="left" valign="top" |To Cleveland Cavaliers
Lauri Markkanen (sign-and-trade) (from Chicago)
|-
|colspan=2 align="left" valign="top" |To Portland Trail Blazers
Larry Nance Jr. (from Cleveland)
|-
! colspan="4" |September
|-
|September 4
|align="left" valign="top" |To Brooklyn Nets
Sekou Doumbouya
Jahlil Okafor
|align="left" valign="top" |To Detroit Pistons
DeAndre Jordan
2022 BKN second-round pick
2024 second-round pick
2025 second-round pick
2027 BKN second-round pick
Cash considerations
|align="center"| 
|-
|September 10
|align="left" valign="top" |To Los Angeles Lakers
Draft rights to Wang Zhelin (2016 No. 57)
|align="left" valign="top" |To Memphis Grizzlies
Marc Gasol
2024 LAL second-round pick
Cash considerations
|align="center"| 
|-
|September 15
|align="left" valign="top" |To Boston Celtics
Juancho Hernangómez
|align="left" valign="top" |To Memphis Grizzlies
Kris Dunn
Carsen Edwards
2026 right to swap second-round picks
|align="center"| 
|-
! colspan="4" |October
|-
|rowspan=2 |October 6
|align="left" valign="top" |To Brooklyn Nets
Cash considerations
|align="left" valign="top" |To Houston Rockets
Sekou Doumbouya
2024 BKN second-round pick
|align="center"| 
|-
|align="left" valign="top" |To Brooklyn Nets
Edmond Sumner
2025 MIA protected second-round pick
|align="left" valign="top" |To Indiana Pacers
Draft rights to Juan Pablo Vaulet (2015 No. 39)
|align="center"| 
|-
! colspan="4" |January
|-
|rowspan=3| January 3
|colspan=2|Three-team trade
|rowspan=3| 
|-
|align="left" valign="top" |To Cleveland Cavaliers
Rajon Rondo (from LA Lakers)
|align="left" valign="top" |To Los Angeles Lakers
Draft rights to Louis Labeyrie (2014 No. 57) (from New York)
|-
|colspan=2 align="left" valign="top" |To New York Knicks
Denzel Valentine (from Cleveland)
Draft rights to Brad Newley (2007 No. 54) (from LA Lakers)
Draft rights to Wang Zhelin (2016 No. 57) (from LA Lakers)
Cash considerations (from LA Lakers)
|-
| January 4
|align="left" valign="top" |To Oklahoma City Thunder
Miye Oni
2028 UTA second-round pick
|align="left" valign="top" |To Utah Jazz
Cash considerations
|align="center"| 
|-
| January 10(trade voided)
|align="left" valign="top" |To Detroit Pistons
Bol Bol
|align="left" valign="top" |To Denver Nuggets
Rodney McGruder
2022 BKN second-round pick
|align="center"| 
|-
| January 13
|align="left" valign="top" |To Atlanta Hawks
Kevin Knox II
2022 CHA protected first-round pick
|align="left" valign="top" |To New York Knicks
Solomon Hill
Cam Reddish
2025 BKN second-round pick
Cash considerations
|align="center"| 
|-
|rowspan=3 |January 19
|colspan=2|Three-team trade
|rowspan=3| 
|-
|align="left" valign="top" |To Boston Celtics
Bol Bol (from Denver)
PJ Dozier (from Denver)
|align="left" valign="top" |To Denver Nuggets
Bryn Forbes (from San Antonio)
|-
|colspan=2 align="left" valign="top" |To San Antonio Spurs
Juancho Hernangómez (from Boston)
2028 DEN protected second-round pick (from Denver)
Cash considerations (from Boston)
Cash considerations (from Denver)
|-
! colspan="4" |February
|-
| February 4
|align="left" valign="top" |To Los Angeles Clippers
Robert Covington
Norman Powell
|align="left" valign="top" |To Portland Trail Blazers
Eric Bledsoe
Keon Johnson
Justise Winslow
2025 DET second-round pick
|
|-
| February 7
|align="left" valign="top" |To Cleveland Cavaliers
Caris LeVert
2022 MIA second-round pick
|align="left" valign="top" |To Indiana Pacers
Ricky Rubio
2022 CLE protected first-round pick
2022 HOU second-round pick
2027 UTA second-round pick
|
|-
|rowspan=2| February 8
|align="left" valign="top" |To Indiana Pacers
Tyrese Haliburton
Buddy Hield
Tristan Thompson
|align="left" valign="top" |To Sacramento Kings
Justin Holiday
Jeremy Lamb
Domantas Sabonis
2023 IND second-round pick
|
|-
|align="left" valign="top" |To New Orleans Pelicans
CJ McCollum
Larry Nance Jr.
Tony Snell
|align="left" valign="top" |To Portland Trail Blazers
Nickeil Alexander-Walker
Josh Hart
Didi Louzada
Tomáš Satoranský
2022 protected first-round pick
2026 second-round pick
2027 NOP second-round pick
|
|-
|rowspan=4| February 9
|align="left" valign="top" |To Miami Heat
2026 second-round pick
|align="left" valign="top" |To Oklahoma City Thunder
KZ Okpala
2023 MIA protected first-round pick deferred to 2025
|
|-
|colspan=2|Three-team trade
|rowspan=3| 
|-
|align="left" valign="top" |To Portland Trail Blazers
Elijah Hughes (from Utah)
Joe Ingles (from Utah)
2022 MEM second-round pick (from Utah)
|align="left" valign="top" |To San Antonio Spurs
Tomáš Satoranský (from Portland)
2027 second-round pick (from Utah)
|-
|colspan=2 align="left" valign="top" |To Utah Jazz
Nickeil Alexander-Walker (from Portland)
Juancho Hernangómez (from San Antonio)
|-
| rowspan="12" |February 10
|align="left" valign="top" |To Boston Celtics
Daniel Theis
|align="left" valign="top" |To Houston Rockets
Bruno Fernando
Enes Kanter Freedom
Dennis Schröder
|
|-
|align="left" valign="top" |To Boston Celtics
2023 ORL protected second-round pick
|align="left" valign="top" |To Orlando Magic
Bol Bol
PJ Dozier
2028 BOS protected second-round pick
Cash considerations
|
|-
|align="left" valign="top" |To Boston Celtics
Derrick White
|align="left" valign="top" |To San Antonio Spurs
Romeo Langford
Josh Richardson
2022 BOS protected first-round pick
2028 protected first-round pick swap right
|
|-
|align="left" valign="top" |To Brooklyn Nets
Seth Curry
Andre Drummond
Ben Simmons
2022 PHI first-round pick
2027 PHI protected first-round pick
|align="left" valign="top" |To Philadelphia 76ers
James Harden
Paul Millsap
|
|-
|align="left" valign="top" |To Charlotte Hornets
Montrezl Harrell
|align="left" valign="top" |To Washington Wizards
Vernon Carey Jr.
Ish Smith
2023 BOS protected second-round pick
|
|-
|align="left" valign="top" |To Dallas Mavericks
Dāvis Bertāns
Spencer Dinwiddie
|align="left" valign="top" |To Washington Wizards
Kristaps Porziņģis
2022 DAL protected second-round pick
|
|-
|align="left" valign="top" |To Indiana Pacers
Jalen Smith
2022 PHO second-round pick
|align="left" valign="top" |To Phoenix Suns
Torrey Craig
Cash considerations
|
|-
|align="left" valign="top" |To Phoenix Suns
Aaron Holiday
|align="left" valign="top" |To Washington Wizards
Cash considerations
|
|-
|align="left" valign="top" |To San Antonio Spurs
Goran Dragić
2022 protected first-round pick
|align="left" valign="top" |To Toronto Raptors
Drew Eubanks
Thaddeus Young
2022 second-round pick
|
|-
|colspan=2|Four-team trade
|rowspan=3| 
|-
|align="left" valign="top" |To Detroit Pistons
Marvin Bagley III (from Sacramento)
|align="left" valign="top" |To Los Angeles Clippers
Rodney Hood (from Milwaukee)
Semi Ojeleye (from Milwaukee)
Draft rights to Vanja Marinković (2019 No. 60) (from Sacramento)
|-
|align="left" valign="top" |To Milwaukee Bucks
Serge Ibaka (from LA Clippers)
2023 second-round pick (from Detroit)
2024 POR second-round pick (from Detroit)
Cash considerations
|align="left" valign="top" |To Sacramento Kings
Donte DiVincenzo (from Milwaukee)
Josh Jackson (from Detroit)
Trey Lyles (from Detroit)
Draft rights to David Michineau (2016 No. 39) (from LA Clippers)
2024 SAC second-round pick (from Detroit)
|-
|}

Free agents
The NBA's free agency period began on August 2 at 6 P.M. EST.

Players would be allowed to sign new offers starting on August 6 at 12 p.m. ET, after the moratorium ended.

* Player option
** Team option
*** Early termination option

Two-way contracts
Per recent NBA rules implemented as of the 2017–18 season, teams are permitted to have two two-way players on their roster at any given time, in addition to their 15-man regular season roster. A two-way player will provide services primarily to the team's G League affiliate, but can spend up to 45 days with the parent NBA team. Only players with four or fewer years of NBA experience are able to sign two-way contracts, which can be for either one season or two. Players entering training camp for a team have a chance to convert their training camp deal into a two-way contract if they prove themselves worthy enough for it. Teams also have the option to convert a two-way contract into a regular, minimum-salary NBA contract, at which point the player becomes a regular member of the parent NBA team. Two-way players are not eligible for NBA playoff rosters, so a team must convert any two-way players it wants to use in the playoffs, waiving another player in the process.

During the 2021–22 season, two-way deals will work a little differently than usual. Rather than being limited to spending 45 days with their NBA teams, two-way players would be eligible to be active for up to 50 of their team's 82 NBA games. And instead of having their salaries by how many days they spend in the NBA, they'll be paid a flat salary equal to 50% of the minimum player salary applicable to a player with zero years of service.

Going to other American and Canadian leagues
The new league of all players is NBA G League, although some players have returned to their former team, as shown below. The NBA contract status of nearly all players is unrestricted free agent, and the rest is stated otherwise.

Going overseas

The following players were on NBA rosters during the previous season, but chose to sign with overseas teams after their contract expired and they became free agents. The players became free agents at the end of the season unless noted otherwise. The list also includes unsigned 2021 draft picks who signed with overseas teams, but excludes unsigned 2021 draft picks who were already playing overseas before the draft.

Waived

Training camp cutsAll players listed did not make the final roster.''† On a two-way contract.© Claimed off waivers by another team.

Draft

The 2021 NBA draft was held on July 29, 2021, at Barclays Center in Brooklyn, New York. In two rounds of draft, 60 amateur United States college basketball players and other eligible players, including international players, were selected. The following players signed a regular rookie contract unless noted otherwise.

First round

Second round

Previous years' draftees

Renounced draft rights

Notes

References

External links
 NBA player transactions at NBA.com

Transactions
2021-22